Juan Legarreta Ugarte (1897 in Irún, Spain - 22 November 1978 in Santiago, Chile) is a former Spanish-Chilean footballer who played for Unión Española as a central defender.

Club career
He began his senior career at the age of 16 playing for Irún Sporting Club, making his debut against an unknown Belgian team and scoring three goals. His best years came with Real Unión - a union of Sporting Club de Irún with Racing Club de Irún - playing a vital role in the club's triumph at the 1918 Copa del Rey Final as he scored both goals of a 2-0 win over Madrid FC (now known as Real Madrid). He then went to Chile to play for both Club Ibérico Balompié and Unión Deportiva Española.

International career
In 1915, aged 18, he represented the Northern Basque Country national team, a squad made-up of Basque players. He was part of the team that won the first edition of the Prince of Asturias Cup in 1915, an inter-regional competition organized by the RFEF. He scored the only goal of a 1-0 win over Catalonia.

He also represented Chile, playing two friendly matches against Argentina on 25 September and 2 October 1921.

Honours
Real Unión
 Copa del Rey (1): 1918

Ibérico Balompié
 Copa Chile (1): 1920

Unión Española
 Liga Central de Football de Santiago (1): 1928
 Copa Chile (2): 1924, 1925

International
Basque Country XI
Prince of Asturias Cup: 1915

References

1897 births
1978 deaths
Sportspeople from Irun
Spanish footballers
Basque Country international footballers
Spanish emigrants to Chile
Spanish expatriate footballers
Naturalized citizens of Chile
Chilean footballers
Chile international footballers
Association football defenders
Real Unión footballers
Unión Española footballers
Chilean Primera División players
Expatriate footballers in Chile
Spanish expatriate sportspeople in Chile
Footballers from the Basque Country (autonomous community)